The Senior Open Championship, or simply The Senior Open (and originally known as the Senior British Open) is a professional golf tournament for players aged 50 and over. It is run by The R&A, the same body that organises The Open Championship. Prize money won in the event is official money on both PGA Tour Champions (formerly the Senior PGA Tour and Champions Tour) and the European Senior Tour. The purse, which is fixed in United States dollars, was $2.5 million in 2021, with a winner's share of $392,800. For sponsorship reasons, it is currently known as The Senior Open Championship presented by Rolex.

History
The tournament was first held  in 1987 and became part of the European Seniors Tour schedule in 1992. It is younger than the PGA Seniors Championship, which started in 1957, as well as the U.S. Senior Open and the Senior PGA Championship. In late 2002 it was designated as the fifth major championship on the Champions Tour schedule. Winners before 2003 were not retroactively designated as Champions Tour major winners until late 2018. Winners gain entry into the following season's Open Championship. The event is usually held the week following The Open Championship, although in 1991 it was held the week before the Open and in 1998 it was held in August, three weeks after the Open.

The 2018 Senior Open was held at St Andrews for the first time, a decision which was heavily influenced by five-time Open champion Tom Watson. In 2020, the championship was cancelled due to the COVID-19 pandemic.

Field
The standard field size is 144 players and an 18-hole qualifying round is held at the championship course on the Monday before the tournament, with a minimum of 24 places available. If fewer than 120 exempt players enter, the field is filled to 144 with more high finishers from qualifying. If more than 120 exempt players enter, the top 24 finishers earn entry even if it causes the field to expand beyond 144.

Winners

Multiple winners
Seven players have multiple victories in the Senior Open Championship:

4 wins: Bernhard Langer (2010, 2014, 2017, 2019)
3 wins: Gary Player (1988, 1990, 1997), Tom Watson (2003, 2005, 2007)
2 wins: Bob Charles (1989, 1993), Brian Barnes (1995, 1996), Christy O'Connor Jnr (1999, 2000), Loren Roberts (2006, 2009)

Winners of both The Open and The Senior Open
Four players have won both The Open Championship and The Senior Open Championship, (two of the professional majors run by the R&A).

Host courses
The Senior Open Championship has been played at the following courses, listed in order of number of times hosted (as of 2022):
7 Turnberry Golf Club
6 Royal Portrush Golf Club
5 Royal Lytham & St Annes Golf Club
3 Royal County Down Golf Club, Sunningdale Golf Club
2 Royal Porthcawl Golf Club, Royal Troon Golf Club, Carnoustie Golf Links
1 Gleneagles, St Andrews, Muirfield, Royal Birkdale Golf Club, Walton Heath Golf Club, Royal Aberdeen Golf Club

Future venues

Notes

References

External links

Coverage on the European Senior Tour's official site
Coverage on the PGA Tour Champions' official site

PGA Tour Champions events
European Senior Tour events
Golf tournaments in the United Kingdom
R&A championships
1987 establishments in Scotland
Recurring sporting events established in 1987